Córrego do Ouro is a municipality in eastern Goiás state, Brazil.

Location and Highway Connections
Córrego do Ouro is located in the Iporá Microregion west of the state capital, Goiânia.  It is 45 km. northwest of São Luís de Montes Belos, the largest town in the region.  Goiânia lies at a distance of 171 km.  Highway connections from Goiânia were made by  GO-060 / Trindade / Claudinápolis (district) / GO-326 / Anicuns / GO-222 / GO-326 / Sanclerlândia / Buriti de Goiás / GO-518. Seplan.  Neighboring municipalities:  Moiporá, Israelândia, Fazenda Nova, Novo Brasil, Buriti de Goiás, and Adelândia

Demographics
Population in 1980: 4,367
Population in 2007: 2,633
Urban population: 1,571
Rural population: 1,062
Population growth rate:  -1.77%

The economy
The main economic activities were cattle raising (64,200 in 2006) and agriculture.  Main crops were rice, bananas, and corn.   There was one dairy:  Laticínios Farlat - Indústria e Comércio Ltda (2007)
GDP (R$1,000.00) in 2005:  18,252
Per capita GDP (R$1.00) in 2005:  6,577

Agricultural data 2006
Farms:  368
Total area:  40,656 ha.
Area of permanent crops: 299 ha.
Area of perennial crops: 496 ha.
Area of natural pasture: 29,174 ha.
Area of woodland and forests:  9,691 ha.
Persons dependent on farming:  900
Farms with tractors: 27
Number of tractors:  29
Cattle herd:  54,200 head

Health and education 
Literacy rate: 85.6% (2000)
Schools: 04 (2007)
Students: 728
Infant mortality rate: 27.14 in 1,000 live births (2000)
Hospitals: 01 with 16 beds
Municipal Human Development Index:  0.726

History 
The history of Córrego do Ouro began in 1934 with the dynamism of Padre Alexandre Pereira.   A bridge was built across the Rio Fartura and the population began to grow.  In 1948 it was raised to the status of district belonging to Goiás to be granted autonomy in 1953.

See also
 List of municipalities in Goiás
Microregions of Goiás

References

 Frigoletto

Municipalities in Goiás